Italy men's national inline hockey team is the national team side of Italy at international inline hockey.

Results history

Roster 2011
In the 2011 the Italian team won silver medal at the FIRS Senior Men's Inline Hockey World Championships, held in Roccaraso, Italy.

Stefano Antinori
Andrea Alberti
Claudio Mantese
Andrea Comencini
Stefano Frigo
Riccardo Mosele
Enrico Dorigatti
Matthias Eisestecken
Luca Roffo
Emanuele Banchero
Ingemar Gruber
Fabio Rigoni
Dennis Somadossi
Riccardo Buggin
Luca Rigoni Luca Felicetti

See also
Italy men's national ice hockey team
Italy men's national roller hockey team

References

External links
 Le Nazionali Azzurre

Inline hockey
National inline hockey teams
Inline hockey in Italy